A la Carte is a live album by guitarist Kenny Burrell recorded in New York in 1983 and released on the Muse label until 1985.

Track listing 
 "I've Never Been in Love Before" (Frank Loesser) – 6:38
 "Dreamy" (Erroll Garner) – 7:00
 "Our Love" (Larry Clinton, Buddy Bernier, Bob Emmerich) – 6:59
 "St. Thomas" (Sonny Rollins) – 5:35
 "Tenderly" (Walter Gross, Jack Lawrence) – 6:01
 "I Thought About You" (Jimmy Van Heusen, Johnny Mercer) – 6:50
 "A la Carte" (Kenny Burrell) – 4:05

Personnel 
Kenny Burrell – guitar
Rufus Reid – bass

References 

Kenny Burrell live albums
1985 live albums
Muse Records live albums